George Beairsto. Aitken (20 May 1836 – 18 February 1909) was a merchant and political figure in Prince Edward Island. He represented 4th Kings in the Legislative Assembly of Prince Edward Island from 1893 to 1897 as a Liberal councillor.

He was born in Lower Montague and was of Scottish descent. In 1868, Aitken married Jane Shaw. He was a justice of the peace.

In the 1897 election, Murdock MacKinnon and George Aitken polled an equal number of votes for the council seat in 4th Kings. MacKinnon was declared elected by Justice E. J. Hodgson under the Controverted Elections Act.

Aitken died of pneumonia in Lower Montague at the age of 72.

References
The Canadian parliamentary companion, 1897 JA Gemmill

1836 births
1909 deaths
People from Kings County, Prince Edward Island
Prince Edward Island Liberal Party MLAs
Deaths from pneumonia in Prince Edward Island